The Codman Building is a historic building at 55 Kilby Street (also known as 10 Liberty Square) in Boston, Massachusetts.  The first four stories of this six-story brick and stone building were designed by Sturgis & Brigham and built in 1874 in the Gothic Revival style.  It is the only one of the firm's commercial designs in the Financial District to survive.  The upper three floors, in a more typical Late Victorian fashion, were added sometime before 1898.

The building was listed on the National Register of Historic Places in 1983.

See also
National Register of Historic Places listings in northern Boston, Massachusetts
Custom House District, the adjacent building

References

Commercial buildings completed in 1873
Commercial buildings on the National Register of Historic Places in Massachusetts
Office buildings in Boston
National Register of Historic Places in Boston